"Crazy in Love" is a song in English, written by Lennart Wastesson, Larry Forsberg, and Sven-Inge Sjöberg, and performed by Swedish pop and country singer Jill Johnson at the Swedish Melodifestivalen 2003, where "Crazy in Love" finished 4th. However, "Crazy in Love" became a Svensktoppen hit in 2003, where it got 13404 points and stayed for 36 weeks. The best placement there was a 1st place.

The single peaked at #9 at the Swedish singles chart.

Charts

References

Jill Johnson songs
2003 songs
Melodifestivalen songs of 2003
English-language Swedish songs